Norman Gilbert Mitchell-Innes, JP (1860–1913) was the Colonial Treasurer of Hong Kong.

Mitchell-Innes was born in 1860 in Gloucestershire. He was acting Registrar General in 1889 and 1890, the Colonial Treasurer of Hong Kong from 1891 to 1895 and the Inspector of Prisons from 1910.

References

1860 births
1913 deaths
Financial Secretaries of Hong Kong
Government officials of Hong Kong
Members of the Executive Council of Hong Kong
Members of the Legislative Council of Hong Kong